Rissoina liletae is a species of sea snail, a marine gastropod mollusk in the family Rissoinidae.

Description
The length of the shell attains 6.9 mm.

Distribution
This marine species occurs off the Philippines.

Original description
      Poppe G.T., Tagaro S.P. & Stahlschmidt P. (2015). New shelled molluscan species from the central Philippines I. Visaya. 4(3): 15-59. page(s): 25-26; plate 8, figs. 4a-b, 5a-b.

References

External links
 Worms Link

Rissoinidae